Feroze Khan, who used the pen name Adarang, was a Hindustani musical composer and artist.

Career
Mughal Emperor Muhammad Shah patronized Adarang, who revolutionized Hindustani classical music through propagation of Khayal.
In the context of Sitar the mention of Adarang deserves attention. Feroze Khan Adarang was one of the chief musicians in the royal court and is considered as the first musician who introduced sitar in the 18th century through the Delhi court. Nawab Dargha Quli Khan's description of his mehfils in Muraqqa-e-Dehli is taken as the earliest mention yet found of Sitar in Northern India.
Later Sadullah Khan the son of Ali Mohammed Khan used to invite Adarang to Aonla for musical conferences.

Personal life
Adarang was the nephew and son-in-law of Sadarang. He was the son of Naubat Khan II. Adarang was the descendant of Naubat Khan and Hussaini (Tansen's daughter).

References

Indian male classical musicians
Indian royalty
Mughal nobility
Indian Shia Muslims
Hindustani instrumentalists
Bandish composers
Veena players